This is a list of submarine classes, sorted by country.  The navies of 46 states operate submarines.

Algeria 
 Raïs Hadj Mubarek class (Type 877EKM Kilo)
 Raïs Hadj Slimane class (Type 877EKM Kilo)
 2 Project 636 (in order)

Albania 
 Whiskey-class

Argentina

Armada de la República Argentina:

 Santa Fe class (1930s built in Italy — decommissioned)
 Santa Fe  (1960s US-built Balao - decommissioned)
 Santa Fe S-21 (1970s US-built Guppy - decommissioned)
Santa Cruz-class (German-built TR-1700 - one remaining boat inactive)
Salta-class (German-built Type 209/1200 - inactive; one used for dockside training)

Australia
Royal Australian Navy:
 Oberon class (decommissioned)
 Collins class (Type 471)

Azerbaijan 
 Triton-1 class midget submarine
Triton-2M midget submarine

Bangladesh
Bangladesh Navy:
 Ming class (Type 035/based on Romeo)

Brazil
Brazilian Navy:
 Foca-class (1913) - (decommissioned)
 Humaita (1927) - (decommissioned)
 Tupi class (1937) - (decommissioned)
 Goiaz class (GUPPY III) (decommissioned)
 Bahia class (GUPPY II) (decommissioned)
 Humaita class (Oberon) (decommissioned)
 Tupi class (Type 209/1400)
 Tikuna (modified Tupi class) (modified Type 209/1400)
 Scorpéne in order (with technology transference)
 SSN being developed with French help

Bulgaria
 Slava class (Romeo acquired from the USSR)

Canada

Royal Canadian Navy:
 Victoria-class submarine - 4 ex-RN Upholder-class in active service
 Oberon-class submarine (decommissioned after 2000); 3 acquired and 2 for training and spares; 2 sold as museum ship (HMCS Ojibwa (S72) and HMCS Onondaga (S73)) and 3 scrapped (HMS Olympus (S12), HMS Osiris (S13), HMCS Okanagan (S74))
Tench-class submarine (decommissioned); built for United States Navy; USS Argonaut (SS-475) renamed HMCS Rainbow 1968 and retired 1974
Balao-class submarine (decommissioned); built for United States Navy; USS Burrfish (SS-312) acquired 1961 and renamed as HMCS Grisle and served until 1969; return to USN and later scrapped.
British H-class submarine (decommissioned); built in United States; acquired 1919 HMCS CH-14 and HMCS CH-15 and disposed 1927 and 1922 respectively
CC-class submarine (decommissioned); built in United States for Chilean Navy and sold to British Columbia 1913; CC-1 and CC-2 Commissioned Royal Canadian Navy 1914; scrapped in 1920

Captured and recommissioned German U-boats 

Captured and recommissioned German U-boats - German Type IX submarines German submarine U-190 and German submarine U-889

Chile
 Capitan O'Brien class - built in Britain in late 1920s
 O'Brien class (Oberon) (decommissioned)
 Thomson class (Type 209/1400) (upgraded)
 O'Higgins class (Scorpène)

People's Republic of China
People's Liberation Army Navy:
 Type 03 class (Whiskey) (decommissioned)
 Type 031 class (Golf) (SSB)
 Type 033 class (Romeo)
 Wuhan class (Type 033G, license built Romeo)
 Ming class (Type 035/based on Romeo)
 Kilo class
 Song class (Type 039)
 Yuan class (Type 041)
 Han class (Type 091) (SSN)
 Xia class (Type 092) (SSBN)
 Shang class (Type 093) (SSN)
 Jin class (Type 094) (SSBN)

Colombia
 Pijao class (Type 209/1200)
 Intrepide class (Italian midget submarine Type SX 506)

Croatia
  modified Una-class midget submarine

Cuba 
 Foxtrot class
 Whisky class (Never exported)

Denmark
Royal Danish Navy:
D class (1926—1946)
H class (1938—1950)
U class (1947—1959)
V class (1947—1958)
Delfinen class (1961—1990)
Narhvalen class  (Type 205) (1970—2004)
Tumleren class (Kobben/Type 207) (1989—2004)
Kronborg class (Näcken) (2001—2004)

Ecuador
 Shyri class (Type 209/1300) (upgraded)

Estonia

Kalev class mine laying submarines

Estonian Navy:
EML Kalev (1936)
EML Lembit

Egypt
 Romeo class (Chinese built, Type033G?)
 Type 209 submarine 2 ordered

Finland
Finnish Navy:
Vesikko (World War II)
Saukko (World War II)
Vetehinen (World War II)

France
Marine Nationale:
 List of French submarines

Germany
Kaiserliche Marine:
 Type U-1 U-boat
 Type U-2 U-boat
 Type U-3 U-boat
 Type U-5 U-boat
 Type U-9 U-boat
 Type U-13 U-boat
 Type U-16 U-boat
 Type U-17 U-boat
 Type U-19 U-boat
 Type U-23 U-boat
 Type U-27 U-boat
 Type U-31 U-boat
 Type U-43 U-boat
 Type U-51 U-boat
 Type U-57 U-boat
 Type U-63 U-boat
 Type U-66 (Type UD) U-boat
 Type U-81 U-boat
 Type U-87 U-boat
 Type U-93 U-boat
 Type U-127 U-boat
 Type U-139 U-boat
 Type U-142 U-boat
 Type U-151 U-boat
 Type UA U-boat
 Type UB I U-boat
 Type UB II U-boat
 Type UB III U-boat
 Type UC I U-boat
 Type UC II U-boat
 Type UC III U-boat
 Type UE I U-boat
 Type UE II U-boat
Kriegsmarine:
 Type I U-boat
 Type II U-boat
 Type VII U-boat
 Type IX U-boat
 Type X U-boat
 Type XIV U-boat
 Type XVII U-boat
 Type XVIII U-boat
 Type XXI U-boat
 Type XXIII U-boat
Modern German Navy:
 Type 240 class (Type XXIII) (decommissioned)
 Type 241 class (Type XXI) (decommissioned)
 Type 201 class (decommissioned)
 Type 202 class (decommissioned)
 Type 205 class (decommissioned)
 Type 206A class (decommissioned)
 Type 212A class
Export Models:
 Gal class (design only)
 Type 207 class (Kobben)
 Type 209 class
 TR-1700 class
 Type 210 class (Ula)
 Dolphin class
 Type 214 class

Greece
Hellenic Navy

 Katsonis-class submarine
 Protefs-class submarine

Greek Navy:
 Glavkos class (Type 209/1100)
 Poseidon class (Type 209/1200)
 Katsonis class (Type 214)

India
Indian Navy:
 Foxtrot Class
 Shishumar (Type 209) Class
 Sindhughosh (Kilo) Class
 Scorpène Class 3 Submarines are ready up to 31 January 2018 and also planning to develop with DRDO.
 Akula Class. Indian navy is paying $2 billion for the completion of two submarines. The agreement was signed in late 2005 in Moscow. India will receive these submarines from late 2006 to late 2007. India will lease them until a projected 5 to 6 ATV indigenous submarines are manufactured. The Indians have a lease/ purchase deal.
 Arihant Class is a Nuclear Powered Ballistic Missile Submarine being constructed by India as a part of the Indian Navy's Advanced Technology Vessel (ATV) Project and is expected to be commissioned by 2015.trails completed on 23 Feb 2016.

Indonesia
Indonesian Navy:

 Whiskey class (decommissioned)
 Cakra class (Type 209/1300)
 Chang Bogo class

Iran
Iranian Navy:
 Tareq class (Kilo)
 SSI
 Ghadir class
 Fateh class
 Nahang class
 Ghaaem class
 Yugo class

Israel
Israeli Navy:
 Gal class
 Dolphin class

Italy

Regia Marina:
 Balilla class
 Medusa class
 Laurenti class
 Cavallini class
 Archimede class
 600 Serie Adua class submarine
 Marcello class
 Marconi class
 Fieramosca class
 Glauco class
 Brin class
 Foca class

Marina Militare:
 Toti class (decommissioned)
 Nazario Sauro class
 Salvatore Pelosi class (improved Sauro)
 Primo Longobardo class (improved Pelosi)
 Salvatore Todaro class (Type 212A)

Japan

Imperial Japanese Navy
 Ko-hyoteki class submarine (midget)
 Kaidai 1 class (aka I-51)
 Kaidai 2 class (aka I-152)
 Kaidai 3a, 3b class (aka I-153 and I-156)
 Kaidai 4 class (aka I-162)
 Kaidai 5 class (aka I-165)
 Kaidai 6a, 6b class (aka I-168 and I-174)
 Kaidai 7 class (aka I-176)
 Junsen J1 class (aka I-1 class)
 Junsen J2 class (aka I-6)
 Junsen J3 class (aka I-7)
 Junsen A1 class (aka I-9)
 Junsen A2 class (aka I-12)
 Junsen A Modified class (aka I-13)
 Junsen B1 class (aka I-15 series)
 Junsen B2 class (aka I-40)
 Junsen B3 class (aka I-54)
 Junsen C1 class (aka I-16)
 Junsen C2 class (aka I-46)
 Junsen C3 class (aka I-52)
 Sen Toku class (aka I-400)
 Sen Taka Dai class (aka I-200)
 Kiraisen class (aka I-121)
 Senho class (aka I-351)
 D1 class (aka I-361)
 D2 class (aka I-373)
 Kaichū class
 Kaishō class (aka Ro-100)
 Sen Taka Sho class (aka Ha-201)
 LA class

Japan Maritime Self-Defense Force
 United States Gato-class:Kuroshio was commissioned on August 15, 1955 and stricken on March 31, 1966. The first Japanese Maritime Self Defense Force submarine.
 Oyashio (SS-511): A single unit, launched on May 25, 1959 and stricken on September 30, 1976. The first indigenous submarine of the Japanese Maritime Self Defense Force.
 Hayashio class
 Natsushio class
 Oshio class
 Uzushio class
 Yushio class
 Harushio class
 Asashio class (modified Harushio to test Stirling AIP System)
 Oyashio class
 Sōryū class
 Taigei class

Republic of Korea
Republic of Korea Navy:
 Chang Bogo class (Type 209)
 Son Won-il class (Type 214)
 Dosan Ahn Changho class

North Korea
Korean People's Army:
 Whiskey class (decommissioned?)
 Romeo class
 Sang-O class
 Yugo class (midget submarine)
 Sinpo class
 SINPO-C ballistic missile submarine (SSB)
 SINPO-class experimental ballistic missile submarine (SSBA)

Libya
 Foxtrot (non operational)

Malaysia
Royal Malaysian Navy:
 Perdana Menteri class (Scorpène)
 Agosta 70 class (decommissioned)

Myanmar
Myanmar Navy:
 Kilo class

Netherlands

Royal Dutch Navy:

 K XI class (decommissioned)
 Walrus (old) class (GUPPY IB) (decommissioned)
 Zwaardvis (old) class (T-class) (decommissioned)
 Dolfijn class (decommissioned)
 Potvis class (enhanced Dolfijn) (decommissioned)
 Zwaardvis class (decommissioned)
 Walrus class

Norway
Royal Norwegian Navy:
 Kobben (1909–1933) One vessel built in Germany.
 A class (1913–1940) Three vessels bought from Germany.
 B class (1922–1946) Six vessels of the U.S. Holland type built under licence in Norway.
 U class (1941–1943) One vessels given to Norway in 1941.
 V class (1949-196X) Two vessels given to Norway in 1943, after the war Norway purchased three more.
 K class (1949-1961) Three vessels left in Norway by the Germans.
 Kobben / Type 207 (1964–2003) Fifteen vessels purchased from Germany.
 Ula / Type 210 (1989-In use) Six vessels purchased from Germany.

Pakistan
Agosta class
PNS Ghazi (Formerly USS Diablo)
Hangor class

Peru
 Abato class (decommissioned)
 Casma class (Type 209/1200)

Poland
Polish Navy:
 Wilk class (3 decommissioned)
 Orzeł class (1 sunk, 1 decommissioned)
 S-1 class (1 sunk)
 U class (2 decommissioned)
 Malyutka class (6 decommissioned)
 Whiskey class (4 decommissioned)
 Foxtrot class (2 decommissioned)
 Kilo class (1 in service)
 Kobben / Type 207 class (4 decommissioned)

Portugal
Portuguese Navy:
Albacora class (Daphné)
Type 209mod (planned for 2010)

Romania
 Delfinul class (Kilo - inactive)
 Dalfinul class (World War II)
 Rechinul class 
 Marsuinul class
 CB class

Russia (and Soviet Union)
Soviet Navy and Russian Navy:
See the list of Soviet and Russian submarine classes

Singapore
Republic of Singapore Navy:
Challenger class (refurbished Swedish Sjöormen class)
Archer class (originally Swedish Västergötland class, upgraded to Södermanland class standards) (commission planned for 2010)

South Africa
South African Navy:
 Maria van Riebeeck/Spear class (Daphné)
 Heroine class Type 209/1400-mod

Spain
Spanish Navy: 
 Peral class
 Isaac Peral class (Laurenti)
 A class (Holland)
 B class (Holland F-105)
 C class (Holland F-105F)
 D class
 General Mola class (Archimede)
 G class (Type VII C)
 Foca class (Spanish version of the Seehund)
 Tiburón class
 Almirante García de los Reyes class (Balao)
 Serie 30 class (Guppy IIA)
 Delfín class (Daphné)
 Galerna class (Agosta)
 S-80 class (in construction)
Export models:
 Gür (E) class
 Scorpene class

Syria 
 Romeo class

Sweden
Swedish Navy:
 Hajen class
 Draken class
 Sjöormen class
 Näcken class (Type A-14)
 Västergötland class (Type A-17)
 Södermanland class (upgraded Västergötland)
 Gotland class (Type A-19)
 Blekinge class (Type A-26)

Taiwan
Republic of China Navy:
 Hai Lung class (Zwaardvis-class submarine) class
 Hai Shih class (Tench class) class

Thailand
Royal Thai Navy:
Matchanu class - 1938–1951

Turkey
Turkish Navy:
 Atilay class (Type 209/1200)
 Preveze class (Type 209T1/1400)
 Gur class (Type 209T2/1400)
 Type 214TN (advanced Type 214)

United Kingdom

Royal Navy:
Holland class
A class
B class
C class
D class
E class
F class
G class
H class
J class
L class
K class
M class
 Nautilus class
R class
 HMS X1
Odin class
Parthian class
Rainbow class
S class
River class
Grampus class
T class
U class
P611 class
V class
 Amphion class
 HMS Meteorite
 Explorer class
 Stickleback class (midget submarines)
 Porpoise class (Diesel-electric hunter-killer)
 Oberon class (Diesel-electric hunter-killer)

Valiant class attack submarines
Resolution class ballistic missile submarines
Churchill class attack submarines
Swiftsure class attack submarines
Trafalgar class attack submarines
Upholder class attack submarines
Vanguard class SSBN submarines
Astute class attack submarines

United States

Ukraine
Ukrainian Navy:
 Kherson class (Foxtrot)

Venezuela
 Sabalo-class (Type 209/1300)

Vietnam
 Kilo class
 Yugo class

Yugoslavia
 Hrabri-class submarine
 Osvetnik-class submarine
 Sutjeska-class submarine
 Sava class submarine
 Heroj-class submarine
 Una-class midget submarine

See also
 Jane's

References

External links

 Hellenic Navy's Submarine OCEANOS (S-118) 3d animation
https://web.archive.org/web/20050330085241/http://library.nps.navy.mil/home/bibs/submarine/subarticlescntry.htm
GlobalSecurity.org
Globaldefence.net
Hazegray & Underway - World Navies Today
World-Wide Inventory of active Diesels (as of 2001)

Submarine classes